Hypermastus is a genus of sea snails, marine gastropod mollusks in the family Eulimidae.

Species
Species within this genus include the following:
 Hypermastus acutus (G. B. Sowerby I, 1834) 
 Hypermastus araeosomae (Habe, 1992)
 Hypermastus auritae (Warén, 1991)
 Hypermastus boschorum (Warén, 1991)
 Hypermastus bulbulus (Murdoch & Suter, 1906)
 Hypermastus casta (A. Adams, 1861)
 Hypermastus colmani (Warén, 1991)
 Hypermastus coxi (Pilsbry, 1899)
 Hypermastus cylindricus (Sowerby III, 1900)
 Hypermastus echinocardiophilus (Habe, 1976)
 Hypermastus echinodisci (Warén, 1980)
 Hypermastus epeterion (Melvill, 1889)
 Hypermastus epiphanes (Melvill, 1897)
 Hypermastus georgiregis (Cotton & Godfrey, 1932)
 Hypermastus indistinctus (Thiele, 1925)
 Hypermastus kilburni (Warén, 1991)
 Hypermastus lacteus (A. Adams, 1864)
 Hypermastus mareticola (Warén & Norris, 1994)
 Hypermastus minor (Warén, 1991)
 Hypermastus mucronatus (Sowerby II, 1866)
 Hypermastus obliquistomum (Warén, 1991)
 Hypermastus orstomi (Warén, 1994)
 Hypermastus peronellicola (Kuroda & Habe, 1950)
 Hypermastus philippianus (Dunker, 1860)
 Hypermastus placentae (Warén & Crossland, 1991)
 Hypermastus productus (Sowerby III, 1894)
 Hypermastus pusillus (Sowerby I, 1834)
 Hypermastus randolphi (Vanatta, 1900)
 Hypermastus roemerianus Matsuda, Uyeno & Nagasawa, 2013
 Hypermastus rosa (Willett, 1944)
 Hypermastus ryukyeunsis (Matsuda, Uyeno & Nagasawa, 2010)
 Hypermastus sauliae (Warén, 1980)
 Hypermastus serratus (Warén, 1991)
 Hypermastus subula (A. Adams, 1864)
 Hypermastus tenuissimae (Warén, 1991)
 Hypermastus tokunagai (Yokoyama, 1922)
 Hypermastus williamsi (Cotton & Godfrey, 1932)

Species brought into synonymy
 Hypermastus bountyensis (Powell, 1933): synonym of Pelseneeria bountyensis (Powell, 1933)
 Hypermastus bulbula (R. Murdoch & Suter, 1906): synonym of Hypermastus bulbulus (Murdoch & Suter, 1906)
 Hypermastus cookeanus (Bartsch, 1917): synonym of Stilapex cookeanus (Bartsch, 1917)
 Hypermastus dunkerianus (Pilsbry, 1901): synonym of Hypermastus philippiana (Dunker, 1860)
 Hypermastus lacteus (A. Adams, 1864): synonym of Melanella tanabensis Takano, Tanaka & Kano, 2019
 Hypermastus roemeriana Matsuda, Uyeno & Nagasawa, 2013 a: synonym of Hypermastus roemerianus Matsuda, Uyeno & Nagasawa, 2013

References

 Warén, A. (1984). A generic revision of the family Eulimidae (Gastropoda, Prosobranchia). Journal of Molluscan Studies. suppl 13: 1–96.

External links

 Warén A. & Crossland M.R.B. (1991). Revision of Hypermastus Pilsbry, 1899 and Turveria (Gastropoda: Prosobranchia: Eulimidae), two genera parasitic on sand dollars. Records of the Australian Museum. 43(1): 85-112

Eulimidae